Highway 36 is a highway in the Canadian province of Saskatchewan. It runs from Montana Highway 13 at the US border near Port of Coronach to Highway 2.

Major intersections
From south to north:

References

036